Marilyn Martin is the debut studio album by American singer Marilyn Martin, released by Atlantic in 1986. The album's various producers include Jon Astley, Arif Mardin, Simon Climie, John Parr and Phil Ramone.

Three singles were released from the album; "Night Moves", "Move Closer" and "Body and the Beat". "Night Moves" reached No. 28 on the Billboard Hot 100, while "Move Closer" reached No. 34 on the Billboard Adult Contemporary chart. The Japanese CD release of the album featured the additional track "Thank You" and Marilyn's 1985 duet with Phil Collins, "Separate Lives".

Critical reception

Upon release, Cash Box listed the album as one of their "feature picks" during February 1986. They commented: "Her strong voice and solid song selection should propel this record." Billboard wrote: "Outstanding rock vocalist gets the royal treatment from a bevy of producers. Despite lacking any clear-cut choices for singles, the album boasts several strong cuts, most notably "One Step Closer" and "Night Moves"." In a retrospective review, Alex Henderson of AllMusic described the album as a "strong debut" and a "solid pop/rock outing", showing "considerable promise" and a "very slick, glossy, high-tech" production.

Track listing

Chart performance

Personnel
 Marilyn Martin – vocals

Production
 Jon Astley, Phil Chapman – producers (tracks 1–3, 9)
 Arif Mardin – producer (track 4, "Thank You" and "Separate Lives")
 Simon Climie – producer (track 5)
 Gary Stevenson – producer (track 6)
 John Parr – producer (track 7)
 Phil Ramone – producer (tracks 8, 10)
 Phil Collins, Hugh Padgham – producers of "Separate Lives"
 George Marino – mastering
Brian Aris - photography

References

1986 debut albums
Marilyn Martin albums
Atlantic Records albums
Albums produced by Simon Climie
Albums produced by Jon Astley
Albums produced by Arif Mardin
Albums produced by Phil Ramone